Grand Ayatollah Mohammad-Reza Golpaygani (March 20, 1899 – December 9, 1993) was an Iranian Shia Muslim and marja' scholar  and was born in 1899 in Gogad village near the city of Golpaygan, Iran. He was taught preliminary studies by his father, Mohammad Bagher. At the age of 9, his father died, and he moved to Golpaygan to continue his studies. He was one of the highest-ranking Islamic clergies to participate in the Islamic Revolution of 1979, and a one-time serious contender to succeed Ruhollah Khomeini in the 1989 Iranian Supreme Leader election. However, his candidacy was voted down by the Assembly of Experts, in favor of the eventual successor, Ali Khamenei.

Family and early life
Ayatollah Seyyed Mohammad-Reza Golpayegani's father Sayyed Muhammad Bagher was a great scholar who made sure his son learned primary education and religious sciences under great masters. At the age of 20, he moved to Arak to study under Abdul-Karim Ha'eri Yazdi and became one of his most noteworthy students. After completing his education and achieving high scientific and spiritual positions, he started teaching and went on to become one of the most important masters of his time. After Ha'eri Yazdi and Ayatollah Mohammad Taghi Khansari founded the hawza of Qom, he moved there and delivered lectures in the Islamic Seminary.

Masters
The following are his main masters: 
 Seyyed Muhammad Hasan Khansari
 Ayatollah Haeri
 Ayatollah Muhammad Taqi Golpayegani

His temporary masters
 Ayatollah Muhammad Baqer Golpayegani
 Ayatollah Muhammad Reza Masjed Shahi Isfahani
 Mirza Naini
 Allameh Sheykh Muhammad Hossein Qaravi Esfahani
 Ayatollah Borujerdi
 Muhaqeq Iraqi
 Seyyed Abul Hasan Isfahani
 Sheykh Abul Qasem Kabi

His students
After the death of "Ayatollah Abdul Karim Haeri" many students and scholars participated in methodology (Osul) classes of Ayatollah Golpayegani: 
 The late Ayatollah Murteza Haeri
 The late Sheikh Muhammad Fakour
 Martyr Murteza Mutahari
 Martyr Seyyed Muhammad Ali Qazi
 Martyr Seyyed Mohammad Beheshti
 Martyr Mufatteh
 Martyr Qoddusi
 Martyr Shah Abaadi
 Ayatollah Meshkini
 Akbar Hashemi Rafsanjani
 Ayatollah Ahmad Jannati
 Ayatollah Ostadi
 Ayatollah Kharazi
 Ayatollah Tuiserkani
 Ayatollah Salawati

Works
He wrote many treatises and books about Jurisprudence and Islam, among them:
 The book of Hajj in 3 volumes
 The Guiding for whom Have Velayah
 The book of Judgment
 The book of witnesses
 Noted on Qrvah Al Vosqa
 Notes on ways of saving
 Issues of hajj
 Treatise on non-distorting of the Holy Quran
 The praying of Jumah day

Death
Ayatollah Golpayegani died in 1993 in Qom near the Shrine of Hazrate Masoumeh.

See also

1989 Iranian Supreme Leader election
Grand Ayatollahs
Lists of Maraji
List of Ayatollahs

References 

1899 births
1993 deaths
Iranian grand ayatollahs
People from Golpayegan